The 2012 German motorcycle Grand Prix was the eighth round of the 2012 Grand Prix motorcycle racing season. It took place on the weekend of 6–8 July 2012 at the Sachsenring in Chemnitz, Germany.

MotoGP race report

This race was most notable for the battle between Casey Stoner and Dani Pedrosa, Stoner's eventual retirement from the race and Pedrosa's victory.

After seven rounds, the top spot is now tied between two riders: On one side Jorge Lorenzo and on the other Casey Stoner, both with 140 points. Lorenzo however, is at the top because he has won one more race than Stoner, namely four to three. In third sits Dani Pedrosa with a close 121 points.

On Saturday, it was Casey Stoner who took the pole - his fourth pole of the season - with a time of 1:31.796. Second is Ben Spies who is +0.193 seconds behind and third is Dani Pedrosa who is +0.285 seconds behind. The second row of the grid consists out of Cal Crutchlow, Jorge Lorenzo and home hero Stefan Bradl in fourth, fifth and sixth place. Álvaro Bautista has to start from the back of the grid after a collision he had with Lorenzo at the previous round in the Netherlands and Franco Battaini replaces the injured Karel Abraham.

All the riders make their way through the warm-up lap, then line up on their respective grid slots. As the lights go out, it is Pedrosa who gets the holeshot from third to lead going into the Coca-Cola Kurve (Turn 1). Spies, who initially looked to have made a good start, does not gain or lose any places but gets relegated to third at Turn 2 when Stoner overtakes him from the outside. Lorenzo and Bradl both make up one position. Crutchlow loses out the most, dropping from fourth to seventh position. In the early stages, it is a Repsol Honda 1-2 that leads the way on the opening lap. Stoner is all over the back of Pedrosa and as they plunge down from Turn 12 to the Sachsen Kurve (Turn 13), he thinks of making a move but decides to stay behind for the time being. At the Queckenberg Kurve (Turn 14), Crutchlow goes up the inside of Nicky Hayden for sixth place.

On lap two, the top two start to open up a small gap to the Factory Yamaha duo of Spies and Lorenzo. At Turn 10, Stoner makes a pass for the lead by taking a shorter line than Pedrosa, switching the lead from one Repsol Honda to the other. Behind them, Crutchlow also passes Bradl for fifth. Héctor Barberá goes up the inside of Valentino Rossi at the Sachsen Kurve for ninth position. Rossi tries to replicate at the Queckenberg Kurve, but to no avail.

Lap three and Andrea Dovizioso has now opened up a gap to his teammate Crutchlow in sixth place. Stoner has opened up a gap to Pedrosa of +0.402 seconds in sector two. Rossi retakes ninth from Barberá. The gap Stoner has to Pedrosa has increased to +0.508 seconds in sector three. Exiting the Queckenberg Kurve, Hayden has a bit of a moment and does a small wheelie because of it.

As Stoner crosses the line to start lap three, the gap shrinks again to +0.485 seconds. In sector one, the gap increases to +0.562 seconds. Michele Pirro has entered the pits to retire from the race due to mechanical problems, the San Carlo Gresini Honda rider stepping off and inspecting the rear of his bike. In sector two, the gap drops to +0.536 seconds. Stoner also sets the fastest lap of the race as his gap continues to decrease to +0.497

On lap four, the gap of the top two continues to increase. Lorenzo has now passed a struggling Spies, who ran wide at Turn 11, who also has come under pressure from Dovizioso. At the Queckenberg Kurve, Crutchlow looks to pass his teammate Dovizioso, but slams on the brakes and decides to stay behind for the time being.

Lap five the gap Pedrosa has to Lorenzo is +2.260 seconds. Mattia Pasini has crashed out of the race, the rider walking away unhurt from the scene.

On lap six, the gap Pedrosa has to Lorenzo is +2.878 seconds. Bautista meanwhile has made up multiple positions and is now in eleventh place, overtaking Randy de Puniet at the Sachsen Kurve a lap earlier.

Lap seven and Cruchlow is now all over the back of his teammate Dovizioso. Bradl is also being harassed by Hayden, the American almost making a move at the Sachsen Kurve but staying behind for the time being.

On lap eight, Dovizioso outbreaks Spies and gets ahead at the Coca-Cola Kurve for fourth. At the Sachsen Kurve, Crutchlow dives down the inside of Spies and passes him for fifth place.

Lap nine and the midfield is very close to each other, starting from Dovizioso. At the front, Stoner is still ahead of Pedrosa but he is slowly closing the gap again.

On lap ten, Crutchlow is all over the back of Dovizioso, the Englishman looking for a way past.

Lap eleven and Crutchlow is still trying to find a way past Dovizioso. Exiting Turn 12, it looked like Crutchlow was ready to get alongside but once again decides to stay behind for the time being.

On lap twelve, the gap between the top two is still stable. No overtakes happen at the front.

Lap thirteen and Spies has closed the gap to Curtchlow, now making it a three-way battle for fourth again. The gap Pedrosa has to Lorenzo is +4.392 seconds and the gap Lorenzo has to Dovizioso is +3.750 seconds.

On lap fourteen, Pedrosa sets the fastest lap. No overtakes happen at the front.

Lap fifteen - the halfway point of the race - and Pedrosa is now slowly closing the gap. Exiting Turn 12, he is now all over the back of the Australian.

On lap sixteen, Pedrosa is still all over the rear of Stoner, shadowing his every move. No overtakes happened at the front.

Lap seventeen and Pedrosa still shadows Stoner from second place, not making any pass.

On lap eighteen however, Pedrosa finally makes his move. He moves out of the slipstream, goes alongside and outbreaks his teammate, taking over the lead. Exiting Turn 5, switching over from the right to the left side, Stoner has a huge moment, causing him to lose time and tow to Pedrosa.

Lap nineteen and Stoner's gap to Lorenzo is +6.497 seconds and Lorenzo's gap to Dovizioso is +5.350 seconds. Stoner slowly closes the gap to Pedrosa and is all over the back of him again exiting Turn 12.

On lap twenty, Stoner looks to make a pass going on the inside at the start/finish straight but stays behind for now. Further back, Rossi overtakes Barberá for ninth. Stoner is still all over the back of Pedrosa, not yet making a pass however.

Lap twenty-one and Stoner's gap to Lorenzo is +7.667 seconds. A bit further back, Dovizioso is still leading the group of three, consisting of Crutchlow and Spies. Spies has a look at the outside of the Coca-Cola Kurve, but stays behind for the time being.

On lap twenty-two, Stoner's gap back to Lorenzo is +8.104 seconds and Lorenzo's gap back to Dovizioso is +6.549 seconds. Stoner is still right behind Pedrosa, shadowing his every move.

Lap twenty-three and Crutchlow is still all over the back of Dovizioso as well, himself being followed closely by Spies. Entering the Sachsen Kurve, both Crutchlow and Spies look to be making a move but decide to stay behind for the time being.

On lap twenty-four, Stoner's gap to Lorenzo is +9.415 seconds and Lorenzo's gap to Dovizioso is +6.867 seconds. Pedrosa and Stoner are still very close together, as are Dovizioso and Crutchlow a bit further back. Exiting Turn 12, he is right behind the Italian but isn't able to make a move, opting to take a slightly different line entering the Sachsen Kurve and go side by side with Dovizioso on exit, but isn't able to take the position and has to slot behind him entering the Queckenberg Kurve.

Lap twenty-five and Crutchlow now outbrakes himself entering the Coca-Cola Kurve, going wide and entering the gravel trap at low speed. He turns the bike and pushes with his feet as to not lose any speed and manages to get back onto the circuit relatively quickly, though he loses multiple places and drops all the way down to eleventh place. Pedrosa and Stoner at the front now have to pass two backmarkers - rookie Danilo Petrucci and Iván Silva - at the short straight between the Sachsen and the Queckenberg Kurve. Both pass them without any problems.

On lap twenty-six, the gap Stoner has to Lorenzo is 10.690 seconds and the gap Lorenzo has to Dovizioso is 7.417 seconds. Stoner is still very close to the back of Pedrosa, still not making a move.

Lap twenty-seven and Stoner is really pushing, still staying behind Pedrosa but waiting for the right opportunity to strike. Backmarker Battaini almost gets in the way of the fight at the Queckenberg Kurve but moves out of the way just in time.

On lap twenty-eight, the penultimate lap of the race, the gap Stoner has to Lorenzo is +11.684 seconds and the gap Lorenzo has to Dovizioso is +6.978 seconds. Further back, Rossi overtakes Barberá for seventh at the entrance of the Coca-Cola Kurve. Stoner is still right behind Pedrosa but still has not made a move. Bautistá tries to retake seventh place from Rossi via a very late lunge at the Sachsen Kurve but runs his bike way too deep and loses two positions as a result. Crutchlow also tries to make a pass by going up his inside at the Queckenberg Kurve but fails to properly make the move and has to stay behind, himself being overtaken by Barberá at the start/finish straight as a result.

The final lap - lap twenty-nine - has started and Pedrosa now sets the fastest lap. Stoner is all over the back of Pedrosa but has still not been able to get past the Spaniard. Drama unfolds at the Sachsen Kurve however as Stoner goes a bit too wide, loses the front and slides out of a strong second place and into the gravel, the Australian tumbling on for a bit before running to his bike to get it restarted. Pedrosa has no further issues and crosses the line to win his first race of the season. Coincidentally, it starts to rain very lightly just as he crosses the line. After lapping Petrucci, Lorenzo comes home in second place, doing a wheelie in the process. Stoner has not been able to get the bike restarted and is forced to retire, him walking alongside the marshalls away from the scene. A photofinish-esque third place is reserved for Dovizioso, who pips Spies just as they both cross the line, the American missing out on a podium finish and having to settle for fourth position. Further back, Bradl holds off Rossi for fifth, the Italian finishing ahead of a charging Bautistá to come home sixth. Stoner is still walking away from the crash site, the marshalls recovering his bike off the circuit by now.

On the parade lap back to parc-fermé, Pedrosa gets greeted by all the marshalls who wave their flags. Pedrosa puts his arm in the air as the crowd celebrates his win. Rossi comes alongside Pedrosa and shakes his hand while still on the bike, congratulating him on his victory, Hayden doing likewise.

Pedrosa is the first rider to arrive at parc-fermé, being congratulated by some of his crewmembers as he puts both his arms in the air to signal victory. He gets hugged by one of the crewmembers, then happily stares into the camera as he celebrates on. Now both Dovizioso and Lorenzo arrive at parc-fermé, the Italian stepping off his bike already. Dovizioso then inspects his own and the other riders' rear tyres for wear as Pedrosa takes off his gloves, still sitting on the bike. A disappointed Stoner has now arrived back at the garage, sitting down in his chair and taking off his gloves in the meantime. As home hero Bradl goes back to his pit box, the crowd cheers him on. Pedrosa meanwhile gets hugged by the Repsol Honda crewmembers at the edge of the fence as Bradl also gets a hero reception at the LCR Honda pit box, the crewmembers hugging him and standing around his bike. Lorenzo goes up to Pedrosa back at parc-fermé and gives him a handshake to congratulate him on the win, then walks over to the section where the media is to be interviewed.

All the riders make their way onto the podium, beginning with Dovizioso, then Lorenzo and then a happy Pedrosa. The constructors trophy gets handed to the crew chief of Honda, then Stanislaw Tillich (then prime minister of Saxony) hands over the third-place trophy to Dovizioso. Vito Ippolito hands the second-place trophy to Lorenzo before Tillich hands Pedrosa the winners trophy, the crowd loudly cheering for him as he receives his trophy. The Spanish national anthem plays for Pedrosa as he smiles with glee on the podium. Once the anthem stops, the crowd applauds and cheers once more as the podium girls hand the riders the champagne, Pedrosa soaking Mike Leitner as others spray each other and the crowd before drinking some of it.

Pedrosa's win, Stoner's retirement and Lorenzo's second place has now blown the title hunt wide open again. Lorenzo now leads the title again on points, having 160 points. In second place is now Pedrosa with 146 points, overtaking Stoner who now is in third place with 140 points.

MotoGP classification

Moto2 classification

Moto3 classification

Championship standings after the race (MotoGP)
Below are the standings for the top five riders and constructors after round eight has concluded.

Riders' Championship standings

Constructors' Championship standings

 Note: Only the top five positions are included for both sets of standings.

References

German motorcycle Grand Prix
German
Motorcycle Grand Prix
German motorcycle Grand Prix